Orange Grove may refer to:

General
An orchard of cultivated orange trees, in the United States often called an orange grove

Places and buildings

Australia
 Orange Grove, New South Wales
 Orange Grove, Western Australia

South Africa
 Orange Grove, Gauteng, a suburb of Johannesburg

United States

By state 
 Orange Grove Boulevard (Pasadena), a major thoroughfare in southern California
Orange Grove Court, a bungalow court listed on the NRHP in Pasadena, California
Orange Grove Plantation (Daytona Beach, Florida), significant in history of Daytona Beach, Florida
 Orange Grove Plantation House (Plaquemines Parish, Louisiana), former Gothic Revival mansion in Plaquemines Parish, Louisiana
 Orange Grove Plantation House (Terrebonne Parish, Louisiana), listed on the NRHP in Terrebonne Parish, Louisiana
 Orange Grove, Mississippi, an area within the city of Gulfport, Mississippi
 Orange Grove Plantation (Saint Helena Island, South Carolina), listed on the NRHP in Beaufort County, South Carolina
 Orange Grove (Dalzell, South Carolina), historic house on the NRHP in Sumter County, South Carolina
 Orange Grove, Texas, a town in Jim Wells County, Texas
 Orangegrove, United States Virgin Islands, on Saint Croix
 Orange Grove, United States Virgin Islands, on Saint Croix

See also
 Orange Grove affair, a political scandal in New South Wales. Australia
Orange Grove Plantation (disambiguation)